Glenn Edmond Shaw is an American scientist specializing in atmospheric physics, especially relating to global climate change and long-range transport of aerosol material.  He is Emeritus Professor of Physics and Atmospheric Science at the University of Alaska Fairbanks and a member of the scientific staff of the Geophysical Institute.  He conducted research on global atmospheric transport of aerosols and feedback of biogenic aerosols on global climate.  He and Kenneth Rahn did research on the sources and climatic effect of Arctic haze. He did pioneering work on the scientific concept of climate homeostasis through the sulfur cycle and atmospheric aerosol.

Life 
Glenn Edmond Shaw was born in Butte, Montana on December 5, 1938. He married Gladys Roberta Culver in 1957 in Butte, Montana. They have five children. He served in the US Navy on the USS Bon Homme Richard (CV-31) during 1957-1959. Highlights of his life and career are recounted in the autobiography "Fingerprints on the Moon."

Education 
Shaw received a BS in 1963 from Montana State University, a MS in 1965 from University of Southern California, and a PhD in 1971 from University of Arizona. His PhD advisors were Benjamin S. Herman and John A. Reagan, and his dissertation was "An experimental study of atmospheric turbidity using radiometric techniques."

Professional Activities 
 Howard Hughes Fellowship, 1963-1965
 Professor, University of Alaska 1971-2010
 Sabbatical at [:de:Physikalisch-Meteorologisches_Observatorium|World Radiation Center], Davos Switzerland sponsored by [Claus Fröhlich] (1977)
 Convenor of International Conference on Arctic Air Pollution, Cambridge England (September 1985)
 Convenor of Chapman Conference on the Gaia Hypothesis, San Diego, CA (1988)
 Sabbatical at University of Vienna, Vienna, Austria sponsored by Othmar Preining (1995)
 Member Polar Research Board of the National Academy of Sciences (1995-1999)
 Trustee, University Corporation for Atmospheric Research (1995-1999)

Research 
Shaw's work helped establish sun photometry as a precision remote measurement technique for studying atmospheric aerosols. He used this technique throughout his career to investigate aerosols in remote regions, including the Arctic, the central Pacific, and the Antarctic. Shaw, working with Kenneth Rahn and using neutron activation technique as a chemical fingerprint identified the source regions of haze that builds up in the Arctic. They found the haze was confined within the boundaries of the Arctic Front, which expands in area to a maximum in spring months. Based on sun photometry measurements made at Mauna Loa Observatory, Shaw documented global-scale transport of aerosol. Shaw measured chemical and physical properties of aerosol over the Antarctic Ice Sheet. He found little evidence of anthropogenic imprint, but did find a strong, naturally occurring, sulfate aerosol. He attributed this sulfate aerosol to the biogenic dimethyl sulfide (DMS) emission in the oceans surround the continent. He suggested that this sulfate aerosol might modulate climate, perhaps in a global feedback loop. These findings opened the way for further work on the possibility of biological regulation of climate; for example, the opening paragraph of the CLAW hypothesis paper states "However, the atmospheric aerosol also participates in the radiation balance, and Shaw has proposed that the aerosol produced by the atmospheric oxidation of sulphur gases from the biota may also affect climate." Shaw published around 200 papers during his career.
Notable papers include:

Runaway electrons in lightning

Precision radiometry (sun photometry) 
 (381 citations as of April 2022.)

Radiative transfer and modeling

Arctic haze and long-range transport of aerosols 
  (219 citations as of April 2022.)
  (271 citations as of April 2022.)

Cloud physics

Global climate 
  (342 citations as of April 2022.)

Miscellaneous

References 

1938 births
Living people
Atmospheric physicists
20th-century American physicists
American atmospheric scientists
Montana State University alumni
People from Butte, Montana
University of Southern California alumni
University of Arizona alumni
21st-century American physicists
University of Alaska Fairbanks faculty
Scientists from Montana
Scientists from Alaska